Martinus ("Mart") Rokes Bras (born 8 August 1950 in Rotterdam) is a former water polo player from The Netherlands, who finished in seventh position with the Dutch Men's Water Polo Team at the 1972 Summer Olympics in Munich. Later on Bras became an international water polo referee.

References
 Dutch Olympic Committee

1950 births
Living people
Dutch male water polo players
Dutch water polo officials
Olympic water polo players of the Netherlands
Water polo players at the 1972 Summer Olympics
Sportspeople from Rotterdam
20th-century Dutch people